Carry On is a British comedy franchise comprising thirty-one films, four Christmas specials, a television series, and stage shows produced between 1958 and 1992. Produced by Peter Rogers, the Carry On films were directed by Gerald Thomas and starred a regular ensemble that included Sid James, Kenneth Williams, Charles Hawtrey, Joan Sims, Kenneth Connor, Peter Butterworth, Hattie Jacques, Terry Scott, Bernard Bresslaw, Barbara Windsor, Jack Douglas, and Jim Dale. The humour of Carry On was in the British comic tradition of music hall and bawdy seaside postcards. The success of the series led to several spin-offs, including four Christmas television specials (1969–1973), a 1975 television series of thirteen episodes, and three West End stage shows that also toured the United Kingdom.

The Carry On series contains the largest number of films of any British film series, and is the second longest running, albeit with a fourteen-year gap (1978–1992) between the 30th and 31st entries. (The James Bond film series is the longest-running, having started in 1962, four years after the first Carry On, though with fewer films.)

Rogers and Thomas were responsible for all 31 films, usually on time and to a strict budget, and often employed the same crew — some of whom were also regulars on the James Bond series, such as Peter Lamont, Alan Hume, and Anthony Waye. Between 1958 and 1992, the series employed seven writers, most often Norman Hudis (1958–1962) and Talbot Rothwell (1963–1974). Anglo Amalgamated Film Distributors Ltd produced twelve films (1958–1966), the Rank Organisation made eighteen (1966–1978), while United International Pictures produced one (1992).

All films were made at Pinewood Studios near Iver Heath, Buckinghamshire.  Budgetary constraints meant that a large proportion of the location filming was undertaken close to the studios in and around south Buckinghamshire, including areas of Berkshire and Middlesex. However, by the late 1960s (at the height of the series' success) more ambitious plots occasionally necessitated locations further afield, which included Snowdonia National Park, Wales (with the foot of Snowdon standing in for the Khyber Pass in Carry On Up the Khyber), and the beaches of the Sussex coast doubling as Saharan sand dunes in Follow That Camel.

Background
Carry On Sergeant (1958) is about a group of recruits doing National Service; its title, a command commonly issued by army officers to their sergeants in the course of their routine duties, was in keeping with its setting. The film was sufficiently successful to inspire a similar venture, again focusing on an established and respected profession in Carry On Nurse. When that too was successful, further forays with Carry On Teacher and Carry On Constable established the series. This initial 'pattern' was broken with the fifth film in 1961, Carry On Regardless, but it still followed a similar plot to that of many of the early films—a small group of misfit newcomers to a job make comic mistakes, but come together to succeed in the end.

The remainder of the series developed with increased use of the British comic traditions of music hall and bawdy seaside postcards. Many titles parodied more serious films, such as their tongue-in-cheek homages to James Bond (Spying), westerns (Cowboy), and Hammer horror films (Screaming!). The most impressive of these was Carry On Cleo (1964), in which the budget-conscious production team made full use of some impressive sets that had been created for the Burton-and-Taylor epic Cleopatra (1963). Carry On Emmannuelle, inspired by the soft-porn Emmanuelle, brought to an end the original Carry On run.

The stock-in-trade of Carry On humour was innuendo and the sending-up of British institutions and customs, such as the National Health Service (Nurse, Doctor, Again Doctor, Matron and the proposed Again Nurse), the monarchy (Henry), the Empire (Up the Khyber), the armed forces (Sergeant, England, Jack and the proposed Flying and Escaping), the police (Constable) and the trade unions (At Your Convenience) as well as camping (Camping), foreign holidays (Cruising, Abroad), beauty contests (Girls), caravan holidays (Behind), and the education system (Teacher) amongst others. Although the films were very often panned by critics, they mostly proved very popular with audiences. In 2007, the pun "Infamy, infamy, they've all got it in for me", spoken by Kenneth Williams (playing Julius Caesar) in Carry on Cleo, was voted the funniest one-line joke in film history. However, this line had originally been used by Jimmy Edwards in the radio series  Take It From Here some years previously. 

A film had appeared in 1957 under the title Carry On Admiral; although this was a comedy in similar vein (and even featured Joan Sims in the cast) it has no connection to the Carry On series itself. The much earlier 1937 film Carry On London is also unrelated (though it coincidentally starred future Carry On performer Eric Barker).

The cast were poorly paid—around £5,000 per film for a principal performer. In his diaries Kenneth Williams lamented this, and criticised several of the movies despite his declared fondness for the series as a whole. Peter Rogers, the series' producer, acknowledged: "Kenneth was worth taking care of, because while he cost very little [...] he made a very great deal of money for the franchise."

Cast 

The Carry On series includes a broad cast across the films and other adaptations. A regular core ensemble cast included Sid James, Kenneth Williams, Charles Hawtrey, Joan Sims, Kenneth Connor, Peter Butterworth, Hattie Jacques, Bernard Bresslaw, Barbara Windsor, and Jim Dale.

Filmography

1950s
 Carry On Sergeant (1958) 
 Carry On Nurse (1959) 
 Carry On Teacher (1959)

1960s

 Carry On Constable (1960) 
 Carry On Regardless (1961) 
 Carry On Cruising (1962)
 Carry On Cabby (1963) 
 Carry On Jack (1964)
 Carry On Spying (1964) 
 Carry On Cleo (1964)
 Carry On Cowboy (1965)
 Carry On Screaming! (1966)
 Don't Lose Your Head (1967)
 Follow That Camel (1967)
 Carry On Doctor (1967)
 Carry On Up the Khyber (1968)
 Carry On Camping (1969)
 Carry On Again Doctor (1969)

1970s

 Carry On Up the Jungle (1970)
 Carry On Loving (1970)
 Carry On Henry (1971)
 Carry On at Your Convenience (1971)
 Carry On Matron (1972)
 Carry On Abroad (1972)
 Carry On Girls (1973)
 Carry On Dick (1974)
 Carry On Behind (1975)
 Carry On England (1976)
 That's Carry On! (1977)
 Carry On Emmannuelle (1978)

1990s
 Carry On Columbus (1992)

Planned films
Several other films were planned, scripted (or partly scripted) or entered pre-production before being abandoned: 

In 1961, concepts including What a Carry On... and Carry On Smoking, which revolved around a fire station, and various attempts to train a bungling group of new recruits. Norman Hudis penned a script for Carry On Flying (1962), about a group of RAF recruits. It got as far as pre-production before being abandoned. Jim Dale was to have a starring role. A spoof of Robin Hood, Carry On Robin, was planned in 1965 to starr the "Carry On regulars". Rogers outlined the film and registered it with the British Film Producers Association but never pursued. Carry On Spaceman was to be released shortly after Carry On Regardless, in 1961. It was scripted by Norman Hudis, and was to satirise interest in the Space Race from the Western world's point of view. The cast was to consist of three would-be astronauts who constantly bungled on their training and their mission into outer space; most likely the trio would have been played by the trinity of Kenneth Williams, Kenneth Connor, and Leslie Phillips that had been established in Carry On Constable. Attempts to revive Carry On Spaceman in 1962 under Denis Gifford, again by Hudis, failed, and the project was subsequently abandoned. An intended sub-sequel to the successful Carry On Nurse was renamed and made in 1967 as Carry On Doctor. Carry On Nurse was alluded to twice in Carry On Doctor, firstly with the sub-titles (one reading Nurse Carries On Again and Death of a Daffodil), and again in a later scene with Frankie Howerd commenting on a vase of daffodils in his hospital room.

Talbot Rothwell scripted a spoof of World War II escape films with Carry on Escaping in 1973. The complete script is included in the book The Complete A–Z of Everything Carry On. A second attempt at Carry On Again Nurse came in 1979, after the series left Rank Films and moved to Hemdale. A completed script had been written by George Layton and Jonathan Lynn in 1977. It was cancelled due to the financial loss of Carry On Emmannuelle.

A planned spoof of the popular American soap opera Dallas was pursued in 1980 as Carry On Dallas. A script was written and casting offers made to Williams, Connor, Douglas, Sims, Hawtrey and Dale. The production was abandoned when Lorimar Productions demanded a royalty fee of 20 times the total production budget. The film idea was revived in 1987, with a launch party consisting of Barbara Windsor, Terry Scott, Anita Harris, Bernard Bresslaw and Jack Douglas. Press interest followed, with the proposed cast interviewed - with a film insert of the launch with Gerald Thomas, on ITV's breakfast programme, but no film materialised. While on holiday in Australia, Gerald Thomas scouted locations and spoke to the Australian Film Commission about a potential Carry On Down Under. The production was abandoned when finance fell through. A complete script was written by Vince Powell and is included in the book Fifty Years of Carry On. The final attempt to create Carry On Again Nurse came in 1988, with a script written by Norman Hudis. It was to revolve around a hospital set for closure, and set to star original actors Barbara Windsor, Jack Douglas, Kenneth Williams, Charles Hawtrey, Kenneth Connor and Joan Sims, with Sims filling in the role of matron that was previously held by Hattie Jacques. The end of the film was going to be a tribute to Jacques, with Sims turning around a photograph of the actress and asking "Well, did I do alright?" (the script is included in the book The Lost Carry Ons). Production was scheduled to begin in June 1988, but the death of Williams two months previously, followed by that of Hawtrey six months later – combined with a budget of £1.5 million, which was deemed too expensive – proved to be the end of the film and it was cancelled.

The final proposed Carry On, before Rogers' death in 2009, was Carry On London. Announced in 2003 by producer Peter Rogers and producer James Black, it remained in pre-production well into 2008. The script was signed off by the production company in late March 2008, and "centred on a limousine company ferrying celebrities to an awards show". The film had several false starts, with the producers and cast changing extensively over time. Only the little-known Welsh actress Jynine James remained a consistent name from 2003 to 2008. Danniella Westbrook, David Jason, Shaun Williamson and Burt Reynolds were also once attached to the project. It was announced in May 2006 that Vinnie Jones and Shane Richie were to star in the film, which was to be directed by Peter Richardson, though Ed Bye later replaced him as the named director. At the 50th anniversary party held at Pinewood Studios in March 2008, Peter Rogers confirmed that he was planning a series of Carry On films after London, subject to the success of the first.

In early 2009, Carry On London or Carry On Bananas was once again 'back on', with Charlie Higson attached as director, and a different, more modern, cast list involving Paul O'Grady (as the acidic Kenneth Williamsesque character), Jynine James, Lenny Henry, Justin Lee Collins, Jennifer Ellison (as the saucy Barbara Windsor type), Liza Tarbuck (paralleling Hattie Jacques), Meera Syal, James Dreyfus, and Frank Skinner (filling in the Sid James role). Despite new media interest and sets being constructed at Pinewood film studios, the film once again was put on hold, and the project was abandoned after the death of Peter Rogers in April 2009.

Reboot  
In May 2016, producer Jonathan Sothcott of Hereford Films announced plans for a new series of Carry On films, beginning with Carry On Doctors and Carry On Campus. As of early 2017, no news had surfaced on whether the planned reboot was still going ahead. On 12 April 2017, Sothcott confirmed to thehollywoodnews that he was no longer involved with the film series. As of September 2019, three Carry On films were set to be filmed back-to-back, after Brian Baker won the rights to the movies following a legal battle with ITV earlier that year. Production of the new films had been planned to take place in spring 2020. However, filming was postponed due to the COVID-19 pandemic and little more was heard about the project until after the death of Barbara Windsor in December 2020, when Brian Baker announced that he will be using old footage of the actress in the film, saying "Barbara will be making an appearance." Baker told the Daily Star Sunday that ‘we have got two new stories and we are looking to do one of the old ones again to bring it up to modern day quality – probably Carry On Sergeant.’

Critical reception

Spin-offs

Television 

The characters and comedy style of the Carry On film series were adapted to a television series titled Carry On Laughing, and several Christmas specials.

Radio
Carry On Radio, starred impressionist Wink Taylor, mimicking the vocal talents of Frankie Howerd, in the reading of a poem relating to the antics of Gawker FM, an inept hospital radio station. Wink's character name is Francis Hungwell. It had its debut at www.qahospitalradio.com

Stage shows

Album 

In 1971, Music for Pleasure released a long-playing record, Oh! What a Carry On! (MFP MONO 1416), featuring songs performed by Kenneth Williams, Jim Dale, Kenneth Connor, Frankie Howerd, Bernard Bresslaw, Joan Sims, Barbara Windsor, and Dora Bryan.

Legacy

Documentaries 
A 50-minute television documentary, What's a Carry On?, was made in 1998 for the 40th anniversary of the first film. It included archive clips, out-takes and interviews with surviving cast members. It was included as an extra on the DVD release of Carry On Emmannuelle.

In November 2003, a TV series titled Popcorn on S4C ran a Carry On special documentary and interviews, featuring Jynine James. This was in respect of a new Carry On film being produced by Peter Rogers called Carry On London. It featured interviews and clips of the past Carry On films and went into detail about the new film and cast. However, despite the script being signed off and sets constructed at Pinewood film studios, the project was shelved, owing to the untimely death of producer Peter Rogers.

A two-hour radio documentary, Carry On Forever!, presented by Leslie Phillips, was broadcast in two parts on BBC Radio 2 on 19 and 20 July 2010. A three-part television retrospective with the same title, narrated by Martin Clunes, was shown on ITV3 in the UK over Easter 2015.

Home media 
The Carry On film series has had numerous individual releases on VHS, and a number of VHSs were released in an eighteen VHS box-set on 1 September 2003.

The film series was first released as a DVD box-set on 1 September 2008, by ITV Studios Home Entertainment. Five years later, on 7 October 2013, it was re-released with smaller packaging. All the movies contained in the collection are also available to buy individually.

Since 2013, StudioCanal has released a number of the Carry On films on Blu-ray, beginning with Carry On Screaming! (21 October 2013), Carry On Cleo (5 May 2014), Carry On Cowboy (2 June 2014) and Carry On Jack (7 July 2014).

Cultural influence 
The success of the Carry On series occasionally led to affectionate parodies of the series by other contemporary comedians:
 In The Spitting Image Book, released in 1985, there is a reference to a fictitious made-for-TV film entitled Carry On Up the Rectum, satirising the transparency of the puns used for Carry On Up the Khyber and possibly Carry On Up the Jungle.
 Harry Enfield's mockumentary Norbert Smith: A Life (1989) includes a clip from an imagined film, Carry On Banging (a parody of the more risque approach of the later films, such as Carry On Dick and Carry On Emmannuelle). The setting is the Greenham Common Women's Peace Camp of the 1980s, and featured Barbara Windsor, Jack Douglas and Kenneth Connor.
 That Mitchell and Webb Look features the sketch "Bawdy 1970s Hospital", which portrays a stereotypical Carry On-style hospital with frequent use of double entendre, except by one doctor who has trouble fitting in as he comes out with simple obscenity, unable to understand the distinction.
 A "flash frame" of the end shot of Carry On Cowboy is used in series two of The Young Ones.
 In Tom Holt's eighth Portable Door novel When It's a Jar (2013) the Carrion franchise offers a "uniquely quirky blend of spatterfest zombie horror and traditional British slapstick-and-innuendo comedy" with titles such as Carrion Nursing, Carrion Camping and Carrion Up the Khyber.
 In The Goodies' book The Making of the Goodies Disaster Movie, the trio visit the set of Carry On Christ in order to get advice from the Carry On team, while they are filming a scene relating to 'The Feeding of the Five Thousand', with some of the cast noted as Kenneth Williams playing 'Pontius Pilate', Charles Hawtrey as 'A Wise Virgin', Barbara Windsor as 'Not a Wise Virgin' and Hattie Jacques as 'The Five Thousand'.
 Clips from several Carry On films are used in In The Movies It Doesn't Hurt (1975), a short film on laboratory safety for schools starring Bernard Bresslaw.
 In the song Some Girls Are Bigger Than Others by The Smiths, one of the lines is "As Anthony said to Cleopatra, as he opened a crate of ale, oh, I say", making reference to Carry on Cleo.

References

Notes

Bibliography

External links 
 Carry On Films at The Whippit Inn  Detailed information on the Carry On film series
 What a Carry On A tribute to the series
 Carry on Films at IMDb
 

 
British film series
Comedy film franchises
Film series introduced in 1958